Joseph Bologne may refer to:
 Chevalier de Saint-Georges (Joseph Bologne, 1745–1799), French fencer, composer, violinist and conductor
 Joseph Bologne (politician) (1871–1959), Belgian socialist politician

See also
 Joseph Bologna (1934–2017), American actor